Three dots can refer to:

3 Dots, a 2013 Malayalam film
Asterism (typography) (⁂), indicates a flourished section break in a document
āytam (ஃ), a Tamil letter which is neither a vowel nor a consonant
Because sign (∵), a shorthand form of the word "because"
Dinkus, commonly represented as three asterisks  or three large dots, usually refers to a break or omission in written text
In Free Masonry, as an abbreviation. Freemasons use  as an abbreviation sign, for example as in "W∴M∴" standing for Worshipful Master; "the L∴", the Lodge.
The letter S in Morse code
 In Japanese maps, the  symbol indicates an historic site.
Therefore sign ( or ∴), a shorthand form of the word "therefore" or "thus"
 In music notation, a triple-dotted note is a note with three dots written after it
 The rest operator in JavaScript; the splat operator in PHP
 Three Dots Tattoo, a prison tattoo in North America
The vertical ellipsis (⋮)

See also
 Dot (disambiguation)
 Two dots (disambiguation)